This is an incomplete list of Statutory Rules of Northern Ireland in 1993.

1-100

 Provision and Use of Work Equipment Regulations (Northern Ireland) 1993 (S.R. 1993 No. 18)
 Personal Protective Equipment at Work Regulations (Northern Ireland) 1993 (S.R. 1993 No. 20)
 Radioactive Substances Act 1948 (Repeals) Regulations (Northern Ireland) 1993 (S.R. 1993 No. 24)
 Workplace (Health, Safety and Welfare) Regulations (Northern Ireland) 1993 (S.R. 1993 No. 37)
 Environmental Information Regulations (Northern Ireland) 1993 (S.R. 1993 No. 45)
 Social Security (Contributions) (Re-rating) Order (Northern Ireland) 1993 (S.R. 1993 No. 60)
 Companies (1990 Order) (Commencement No. 4) Order (Northern Ireland) 1993 (S.R. 1993 No. 63)
 Companies (1990 No. 2 Order) (Commencement No. 6) Order (Northern Ireland) 1993 (S.R. 1993 No. 64)
 Companies (1986 Order) (Disclosure of Remuneration for Non-Audit Work) Regulations (Northern Ireland) 1993 (S.R. 1993 No. 65)
 Companies (Inspection and Copying of Registers, Indices and Documents) Regulations (Northern Ireland) 1993 (S.R. 1993 No. 66)
 Companies (1990 Order) (Eligibility for Appointment as Company Auditor) (Consequential Amendments) Regulations (Northern Ireland) 1993 (S.R. 1993 No. 67)
 Registered Homes (1992 Order) (Commencement) Order (Northern Ireland) 1993 (S.R. 1993 No. 75)
 Road Traffic (Carriage of Explosives) Regulations (Northern Ireland) 1993 (S.R. 1993 No. 83)

101-200

 Health and Personal Social Services (Assessment of Resources) Regulations (Northern Ireland) 1993 (S.R. 1993 No. 127)
 Social Security (Contributions) (Amendment No. 5) Regulations (Northern Ireland) 1993 (S.R. 1993 No. 130)
 Health and Safety (Enforcing Authority) Regulations (Northern Ireland) 1993 (S.R. 1993 No. 147)
 Social Security Benefits Up-rating Order (Northern Ireland) 1993 (S.R. 1993 No. 150)
 Social Security (Industrial Injuries) (Dependency) (Permitted Earnings Limits) Order (Northern Ireland) 1993 (S.R. 1993 No. 151)
 Statutory Sick Pay (Rate of Payment) Order (Northern Ireland) 1993 (S.R. 1993 No. 152)
 Child Support (Northern Ireland) Order 1991 (Consequential Amendments) Order (Northern Ireland) 1993 (S.R. 1993 No. 157)
 Social Security Benefits Up-rating Regulations (Northern Ireland) 1993 (S.R. 1993 No. 159)
 Part XXIII Companies and Credit and Financial Institutions (Branch Disclosure) Regulations (Northern Ireland) 1993 (S.R. 1993 No. 198)
 Companies (1986 Order) (Disclosure of Branches and Bank Accounts) Regulations (Northern Ireland) 1993 (S.R. 1993 No. 199)
 Companies (Forms) (Amendment) Regulations (Northern Ireland) 1993 (S.R. 1993 No. 200)

201-300

 Belfast Harbour (Variation of Limits) Order (Northern Ireland) 1993 (S.R. 1993 No. 204)
 Companies (1986 Order) (Amendment of Articles 258 and 259) Regulations (Northern Ireland) 1993 (S.R. 1993 No. 220)
 County Courts (Financial Limits) Order (Northern Ireland) 1993 (S.R. 1993 No. 282)

301-400

 Lifting Plant and Equipment (Records of Test and Examination etc.) Regulations (Northern Ireland) 1993 (S.R. 1993 No. 366)
 Offshore Safety (Repeals and Modifications) Regulations (Northern Ireland) 1993 (S.R. 1993 No. 384)

401-500

 Animals (Scientific Procedures) Act (Amendment) Order (Northern Ireland) 1993 (S.R. 1993 No. 407)
 Chemicals (Hazard Information and Packaging) Regulations (Northern Ireland) 1993 (S.R. 1993 No. 412)
 Administration of Estates (Rights of Surviving Spouse) Order (Northern Ireland) 1993 (S.R. 1993 No. 426)
 Social Security (Contributions) (Miscellaneous Amendments) Regulations (Northern Ireland) 1993 (S.R. 1993 No. 437)
 Industrial Relations (1993 Order) (Commencement No. 1) Order (Northern Ireland) 1993 (S.R. 1993 No. 476)
 Social Security (Severe Disablement Allowance) (Amendment) Regulations (Northern Ireland) 1993 (S.R. 1993 No. 487)
 Departments (Transfer of Functions) (No. 3) Order (Northern Ireland) 1993 (S.R. 1993 No. 494)

External links
  Statutory Rules (NI) List
 Draft Statutory Rules (NI) List

1993
Statutory rules
Northern Ireland Statutory Rules